Rolling Oaks Mall is a regional shopping mall located in northeast San Antonio, Texas, at the intersection of Loop 1604 and Nacogdoches Road. It is anchored by Dillard's and JCPenney. There are two vacant anchor store that were once Sears and Macy's.

History
The mall developed by Simon Property Group opened in 1988, with anchor stores Dillard's and Sears, in a remote location surrounded mostly by farmland on the Northeast side of the city. As a result of miscalculated growth projections in the area and a less than ideal location the mall initially struggled. 

A 6-screen movie theater operated by Act III Theaters under the Santikos Entertainment brand opened in 1991, and a Beall's in 1995. The theater and Beall's closed in 2001. The theater space eventually became a skate park and is now an Inflatable Wonderland.  The Beall's space reopened as an H&M outlet in 2017. In 1992 the mall expanded its retail area with a new wing and added a third anchor, Foley's (rebranded as Macy's in 2006).

As the city grew to meet the mall, Rolling Oaks has repositioned itself and is a stable retail center.  Additionally, JCPenney opened a new store at the mall in 2004. The original site plan was designed to accommodate 5 anchor stores and one minor anchor store.   In 2014 Simon Property Group rolled over ownership of Rolling Oaks Mall, along with 97 other smaller properties n their portfolio into its REIT, Washington Prime Group.

On June 19, 2020, it was announced that Sears would be closing as part of a plan to close 28 stores nationwide. The store closed in August 2020.

On January 6, 2021, it was announced that Macy's would be closing in April 2021 as part of a plan to close 46 stores nationwide. The store closed in April 2021, and as of May 2021, Dillard's and JCPenney are the only anchor stores left. The mall was purchased by the Kohan Retail Investment Group in September 2022.

2017 shooting
On January 22, 2017, one person was killed and seven others were injured after two men robbed a jewelry store in the mall. Police Chief William McManus released in a statement that after the two suspects fled the store on Sunday, they were accosted by a pair of "good samaritans", at least one of whom was armed using a concealed carry permit. One suspect was injured in a successful attempt to stop him, however one of the pair of samaritans was shot and killed in the process. The other suspect fled the mall, firing his weapon and injuring others. The suspect escaped after fleeing the area and firing his weapon, injuring others nearby. He was eventually caught and arrested by Converse police later that day after crashing a stolen getaway car.

Major Anchors
Dillard's (opened 1988, 176,585 sq ft.)
JCPenney (opened 2004, 136,312 sq ft.)

Minor Anchors
H&M (opened 2017, 20,000 sq ft.)Former Anchors
Beall's (opened 1995, closed 2001, 20,000 sq ft.)Sears (opened 1988, closed August 2020, 133,935 sq ft.)Macy's (opened 1992 as Foley's, became Macy's 2006, closed April 2021, 150,313 sq ft.)''

References

External links 
Rolling Oaks Mall website

Kohan Retail Investment Group
Shopping malls in San Antonio
Shopping malls established in 1988
1988 establishments in Texas